Zohra is a 1922 silent 35 mm short film from Tunisia by Albert Samama ('Chikly'). It was the first indigenous North African film production. The movie script was written by Chikly's daughter, Haydée Chikly, who also edited and starred as the key female protagonist in the film.

Plot

The plot of the movie evolves around a shipwrecked young French woman, who is rescued by Beduins. She lives with the Beduin tribe for a time. She is later abducted by bandits, but is rescued by a French aviator and reunites with her family. Tribal customs are displayed in detail in the film. The movie is seen as an example of the 'mysterious Orient' genre.

Reception
The film was screened at the Omnia Pathé cinema in Tunis, and enjoyed a degree of success.

References

1922 in Tunisia
Silent films
1922 films
Tunisian short films